Litoria majikthise is a species of frog in the subfamily Pelodryadinae, found in New Guinea.
Its natural habitats are subtropical or tropical moist lowland forests, subtropical or tropical swamps, rivers, and swamps, and it is threatened by habitat loss.

Taxonomy
Litoria majikthise was described in 1994 by Johnston and Richard. "Majikthise" is a reference to both the fictional philosopher Majikthise in The Hitchhiker's Guide to the Galaxy, and the frog's "vividly coloured thighs and groin."

References

Litoria
Amphibians of Papua New Guinea
Amphibians described in 1994
Taxonomy articles created by Polbot